Dust of the Damned is a 2012 novel by Western author Peter Brandvold. It is a horror Western with supernatural content. The two main characters are werewolf hunter Uriah Zane, and beautiful Deputy U.S. Marshal Aubrey Coffin.

Plot
Dust of the Damned is about fugitive werewolves who were released from prison by Abraham Lincoln to help him fight the American Civil War on the condition that after the war they would return to Eastern Europe but they did not keep their promise and headed to the American West. Zane and Coffin's job is to hunt them down.

External links
 Fiction Review: Dust of the Damned at Publishers Weekly

2012 American novels
2010s horror novels
American horror novels
Horror Westerns
United States Marshals Service in fiction
Werewolf novels
Western (genre) novels
Berkley Books books